Dzianis Harazha, Belarusian: Дзяніс Гаража (born 15 May 1987) is a Belarusian sprint canoer who has competed since the late 2000s. He has won five gold medals at the ICF Canoe Sprint World Championships (C-1 500 m: 2009, 2010; C-4 1000 m: 2009, 2010, 2011).

External links
Canoe09.ca profile

1987 births
Belarusian male canoeists
Living people
Canoeists at the 2012 Summer Olympics
Olympic canoeists of Belarus
ICF Canoe Sprint World Championships medalists in Canadian